Gajeva planina (Serbian Cyrillic: Гајева планина) is a mountain on the border of Serbia and Bosnia and Herzegovina, between towns of Priboj and Rudo.

References

Mountains of Serbia
Mountains of Bosnia and Herzegovina